Creature (also known as The Titan Find and Titan Find) is a 1985 American science fiction horror film directed by William Malone, starring Stan Ivar, Wendy Schaal, Lyman Ward, Annette McCarthy, Robert Jaffe, Diane Salinger, and Klaus Kinski. It features early special effects work by Robert and Dennis Skotak, who would go on to design the special effects for Aliens.

Plot
Two geological researchers for the American multinational corporation NTI find an ancient alien laboratory on Titan, the largest moon of Saturn. In the lab is an egg-like container which is keeping an alien creature alive. The creature emerges and kills the researchers. Two months later, the geologists' spaceship crashes into the space station Concorde in orbit around Earth's Moon, its pilot having died in his seat.

NTI dispatches a new ship, the Shenandoah, to Titan. Its crew, consisting of Captain Mike Davison, Susan Delambre, Jon Fennel, Dr. Wendy H. Oliver, David Perkins and Beth Sladen, is accompanied by the taciturn security officer Melanie Bryce. While in orbit, the crew locate a signal coming from the moon—the distress call of a ship from the rival West German multinational Richter Dynamics. The ground collapses beneath their landing site, dropping the Shenandoah into a cavern and wrecking it. When radio communication fails, a search party is sent out to contact the Germans.

In the West German ship, they find the egg-like container and the dead bodies of the crew. The creature appears and kills Delambre when she lags behind the escaping group. Fennel goes into shock at the sight and Bryce sedates him. When they return to their own ship, the Americans find that one of the West Germans, Hans Rudy Hofner, has snuck aboard. He tells them his crew was slain by the creature, which was buried with other organisms as part of a galactic menagerie. He proposes returning to his ship to get explosives, but the crew are unwilling to risk it.

The creature's undead victims are controlled by the creature through parasites. Unsupervised in the medbay, Fennel sees the undead Delambre through a porthole and follows her outside. She strips naked, and he stands transfixed while she removes his helmet. He asphyxiates, and then she attaches an alien parasite to his head. Now under alien control, Fennel sends a transmission to his crewmates, inviting them over to the German ship. Hofner and Bryce are sent to get some air tanks for the Shenandoah and stand guard over it, while the rest of the crew go over to the Richter ship. Hofner and Bryce stop over at the menagerie on their way, and are attacked by Delambre. The rest of the crew find Fennel with a bandage on his head to conceal his parasite. Davison insists that medical officer Oliver examine his head, so Fennel has her accompany him to the engineering quarters to feed her to the creature. Davison and Perkins notice Fennel does not sweat and go check on them. They find Oliver has been decapitated by the creature. Perkins blows up Fennel's head with his pistol.

Sladen runs into an infected Hofner. She escapes the ship, and in her haste, only puts on her helmet after exiting. Perkins spots her outside and opens the airlock. Now unconscious, Sladen is carried in by Hofner to lure the others. They fight, and Davison defeats Hofner by ripping off his parasite. The three survivors formulate a plan to electrocute the creature with the ship's fusion modules, which can only be accessed by going through the engineering quarters.

Alarms sound as a creature makes its way through the ship, committing sabotage. Sladen and Davison construct the electrocution trap, while Perkins goes to the computer room to monitor the creature. The creature arrives, and they apparently electrocute it to death. However, when Davison leaves, it captures Sladen.

Davison and Perkins follow her screaming and find her locked inside engineering. Studying the ship's blueprints, they find another entrance to engineering. Perkins lures away the creature while Davison retrieves Sladen. On the way, Perkins locates one of the bombs Hofner mentioned. The creature jumps him. Dying, Perkins attaches the bomb to the creature and sets a countdown so Davison can jettison it through the airlock. It climbs back aboard, however, so Davison tackles it, throwing himself out the airlock. When the bomb fails to explode, Bryce appears and shoots it, which sets it off and kills the creature. She recovers Davison and reunites with Sladen, who dresses Davison's wounds. The trio leaves Titan aboard the West German ship.

Cast
 Stan Ivar as Captain Mike Davison
 Wendy Schaal as Beth Sladen
 Lyman Ward as David Perkins 
 Robert Jaffe as Jon Fennel
 Diane Salinger as Melanie Bryce
 Annette McCarthy as Dr. Wendy H. Oliver
 Marie Laurin as Susan Delambre 
 Klaus Kinski as Hans Rudy Hofner

Reception
Neil Gaiman reviewed Titan Find for Imagine magazine, and stated that "an Alien rip-off, in which brain-sucking monsters severely menace astronauts on Titan, Saturn's largest moon. Lots of bone-crunching, oozings, and going into dark cabins on one's own."

At the 12th Saturn Awards, held in 1985, Creature was nominated for Best Horror Film and Best Special Effects by the Academy of Science Fiction, Fantasy and Horror Films, but lost both to Gremlins.

Home media
Sometime after the film's release, the film fell into the public domain and received numerous VHS and DVD releases. In 2007, Creature was shown on the horror hosted television series Cinema Insomnia. Apprehensive Films later released the Cinema Insomnia version on DVD.

In March 2013, director Malone independently re-released Creature on DVD under its initial title of The Titan Find, fully uncut and in widescreen for the first time.

The film, in both its theatrical "Creature" version and the original "The Titan Find" director's cut, was released on Blu-ray by Vinegar Syndrome on November 26, 2021.

Novelization
A novelization of the film was later written by Christian Francis and released on September 2, 2021.

See also

 List of films in the public domain in the United States

References

External links
 
 
 
 Creature film trailer at YouTube

1985 films
1985 horror films
American science fiction horror films
1980s science fiction horror films
Films about astronauts
Films directed by William Malone
Fictional parasites and parasitoids
1980s monster movies
Titan (moon) in film
Films about extraterrestrial life
1980s English-language films
1980s American films